The Neave Baronetcy, of Dagnam Park in the County of Essex, is a title in the Baronetage of Great Britain. It was created on 13 May 1795 for Richard Neave, Governor of the Bank of England from 1783 to 1785. Dorina Neave (1880–1955), wife of Sir Thomas (died 1940), was the author of three books about Turkey. She settled with her husband at Dagnam Park and was the last of the family to live there before its requisition in the winter of 1940 and eventual demolition in 1950.

The soldier and Conservative politician Airey Neave was the son of Sheffield Airey Neave, grandson of Sheffield Neave, third son of the second Baronet. After his assassination in 1979 his widow Diana Neave was created a life peer as Baroness Airey of Abingdon in his honour.

Neave baronets, of Dagnam Park (1795)
Sir Richard Neave, 1st Baronet (1731–1814) 
Sir Thomas Neave, 2nd Baronet (1761–1848) 
Sir Richard Digby Neave, 3rd Baronet (1793–1868) 
Sir Arundell Neave, 4th Baronet (1829–1877) 
Sir Thomas Lewis Hughes Neave, 5th Baronet (1874–1940), wife Dorina Neave (1880–1955)   
Sir Arundell Thomas Clifton Neave, 6th Baronet (1916–1992) 
Sir Paul Arundell Neave, 7th Baronet (born 1948)

External links
Guide to Dagnam Park 
Stained glass window in church of St Mary the Virgin, Prittlewell, Essex – dedicated to Sir Arundell Neave by his wife

References

Kidd, Charles, Williamson, David (editors). Debrett's Peerage and Baronetage (1990 edition). New York: St Martin's Press, 1990.

Neave
1795 establishments in Great Britain